The Best of SHeDAISY is the only compilation album by the American country music group of the same name. It was released on February 5, 2008 on Lyric Street Records. The album comprises 12 tracks from their previous studio albums. "God Bless the American Housewife" is the only track on this compilation not to have been released as a single in the US, although it was issued in Canada as "God Bless the Canadian Housewife".

Track listing
"Little Good-Byes" (Kenny Greenberg, Kristyn Osborn, Jason Deere) - 3:20 (from The Whole SHeBANG)
"This Woman Needs" (Connie Harrington, Bonnie Baker, Osborn) - 3:20 (from The Whole SHeBANG)
"I Will… But" (Osborn,  Deere) - 3:40 (from The Whole SHeBANG)
"Lucky 4 You (Tonight I'm Just Me)" (Coley McCabe, Osborn, Deere) - 4:00 (from The Whole SHeBANG)
"Get Over Yourself" (Marcus Hummon, Osborn) - 3:25 (from Knock on the Sky)
"Mine All Mine" (Hollie Poole, Osborn) - 3:57 (from Knock on the Sky)
"Passenger Seat" (Osborn, Harrington) - 3:25 (from Sweet Right Here)
"Come Home Soon" (Osborn, John Shanks) - 4:03 (from Sweet Right Here)
"Don't Worry 'bout a Thing" (Osborn, Deere) - 3:36 (from Sweet Right Here)
"I'm Taking the Wheel" (Shanks, Osborn) - 3:14 (from Fortuneteller's Melody)
"In Terms of Love" (Don Schlitz, Osborn) - 3:41 (from Fortuneteller's Melody)
"God Bless the American Housewife" (Jann Arden Richards, Russell Broom) - 3:10 (from Fortuneteller's Melody)

The digital edition of the album replaces "Mine All Mine" with "23 Days" from Fortuneteller's Melody.

Chart performance

References

2008 greatest hits albums
SHeDAISY albums
Albums produced by Dann Huff
Lyric Street Records compilation albums